Bastion is a global marketing and advisory company headquartered in the Melbourne, Australia suburb of Richmond, Victoria. It is reportedly the largest independent marketing and communications group in Australia, and was founded in 2009 by former professional Australian rules footballer Fergus Watts. Watts serves as the company's executive chairman.

History 
Bastion was founded in 2009 as Bastion Group by 23 year old Fergus Watts, who briefly played for the Adelaide Football Club and the St Kilda Football Club in the Australian Football League (AFL). After his football career ended due to an injury, he started working in an advertising agency, and then decided to form his own company.

In October 2015, the company changed its name to Bastion Collective.

In January 2016, the company acquired Melbourne and Sydney-based research agency Latitude Insights, renaming it Bastion Latitude.

In March 2017, the company received media coverage for its policy of unlimited leave for its staff. In October, the company hired former US Air Force fighter pilot Dax Cornelius to launch its expansion in the United States. It opened an office in Irvine, California, and in 2018 formed its U.S. footprint with the acquisitions of digital marketing firm Rare Branding and web-app development firm Digital Brand Group (DBG), followed by LFPR, a social media and public relations company. Rare Branding and DBG were merged to form Bastion Rare, and LFPR was rebranded as Bastion Elevate.

In May 2018, the company launched Bastion China, an advisory firm for companies doing business with China, and Bastion Engage, a community and government engagement agency. In July, the company launched creative agency Bastion State. In October, the company announced it was buying a stake in Sydney, Australia-based agency Banjo. In November, the company acquired social research company Stable Research, and Melbourne-based production house Bengar Films. Bengar Films was merged with Bastion's production business Bastion Stadium to form Bastion Films.

In November 2019, Bastion acquired a Highland Park, California-based consumer insights and strategy agency db5. In 2020, Peter Harris was appointed as the CEO of Bastion Insights, coming from his CEO position at Potentiate.

In October 2021, the company changed its name to Bastion.

Operations 

Founder Fergus Watts serves as Bastion's non-executive chairman, his brother Jack serves as Global CEO, and Dax Cornelius is the United States CEO. Former AFL CEO Andrew Demetriou and sports broadcaster Hamish McLachlan sit on the company's board. 

The company's global headquarters is in the Melbourne, Australia suburb of Richmond, Victoria, with additional offices in Sydney, Los Angeles, and Shanghai.

The company operates several sub-divisions:
Bastion Asia, an advisory firm for businesses targeting the Asian market
Bastion Experience, formerly Bastion EBA, based in Melbourne, is the company's sports marketing division
Bastion Amplify, formerly Bastion Effect, is the company's communications and public relations arm
Bastion Films, the company's film production business
Bastion Reputation, a reputation management company offers corporation affairs, issues and crisis communications
Bastion Creative, a creative and advertising agency
Bastion Insights, a research and insights consultancy 

In the United States, the company operates three businesses as part of Bastion Collective USA:
Bastion db5, a consumer insights and strategy agency
Bastion Elevate, a social media and public relations company
Bastion Rare, a web / mobile application developer and digital marketing firm

References

External links

Advertising agencies of Australia
Advertising agencies of the United States